The 1886–87 FAW Welsh Cup was the tenth edition of the annual knockout tournament for competitive football teams in Wales.

First round

The match was scratched.

Second round

Replay

Third round

Replays

Fourth round

Semifinals

Replays

Final

References

Bibliography

Notes 

 The History of the Welsh Cup 1877-1993 by Ian Garland (1991) 
 Welsh Football Data Archive

1886-87
1886–87 domestic association football cups